Trevor James was the dean of St Paul's Cathedral, Dunedin, New Zealand, from 2009 to 2018.

Trevor James may also refer to:

Trevor James (athlete) (born 1949), Trinidad and Tobago sprinter
Trevor James (traveler) (born 1988), Canadian food and travel vlogger
Trevor James (football manager), English football manager

See also

 Trevor Jamieson (born 1975), Australian actor